The salmon smooth-head (Conocara salmoneum), also called the deepsea slickhead, is a species of fish in the family Alepocephalidae.

Description

The salmon smooth-head is brownish in colour. Its head is large, about a third of its length. It has 25–27 anal soft rays.

Habitat

References

Alepocephalidae
Fish described in 1897
Taxa named by Theodore Gill
Taxa named by Charles Haskins Townsend